Leucocoryne purpurea, called the purple glory-of-the-sun, is a species of flowering plant in the genus Leucocoryne, native to central Chile. It has gained the Royal Horticultural Society's Award of Garden Merit.

References

Allioideae
Endemic flora of Chile
Plants described in 1854